Gervase Holles (9 March 1607 – 10 February 1675) was an English lawyer, antiquarian and politician who sat in the House of Commons  from 1640 to 1642. He fought in the Royalist army in the English Civil War.
 
Holles was the son of Frescheville Holles of Grimsby, Lincolnshire and was baptised at Grimsby on 13 March 1607. He was Mayor of Grimsby in 1636, 1638 and was called to the bar at Middle Temple in 1639.

In April 1640, Holles was elected Member of Parliament for Grimsby in the Short Parliament. He was re-elected MP for Grimsby for the Long Parliament in November 1640. He supported the King and was  disabled in August, 1642. He was awarded MA at Oxford University on 1 November 1642  and served as colonel of foot to Charles I and Louis XIV. He was an antiquary and during his exile in Holland wrote on historical subjects including Parentela Hollesiorum and  Lincolnshire Church Notes.

After the Restoration, Holles was re-elected MP for Grimsby in 1661 for the Cavalier Parliament and sat until his death in 1675.  In 1663, he was Mayor of Grimsby for the third and last time. He was secretary of petitions to Charles II and one of the Masters of Requests.

Holles died at the age of 67 and was buried at Mansfield, Nottinghamshire.

Holles married twice. His second wife was Elizabeth Molesworth and their only son, Frescheville, was also Mayor and MP for Grimsby.

References

 

1607 births
1675 deaths
Cavaliers
Mayors of Grimsby
Members of the Middle Temple
English MPs 1640 (April)
English MPs 1640–1648
English MPs 1661–1679
Members of the Parliament of England for Great Grimsby